İkiztepe is a quarter of the town Pazar, Pazar District, Rize Province, northeastern Turkey. Its population is 430 (2021).

History 
According to list of villages in Laz language book (2009), name of the neighborhood is Larozi or Laroni. Most inhabitants of the neighbourhood are ethnically Laz.

References

Populated places in Pazar District, Rize
Laz settlements in Turkey